2nd Earl of Derby may refer to:

 Robert de Ferrers, 2nd Earl of Derby (died 1162), English nobleman
 John of Gaunt (1340–1399), previously the Earl of Derby, English nobleman and member of the House of Plantagenet
 Thomas Stanley, 2nd Earl of Derby (before 1485–1521), English nobleman, politician, and peer